Syed Najeeb Ahmed (17 November 1963 – 11 April 1990) also known as Quaid e Talba (Leader of Students) was a leftist Pakistani student activist who was murdered in 1990.

Born to a Muhajir family in Karachi, Ahmed was a PSF (student wing of PPP) leader in Karachi and president of PSF, Karachi division. He is dubbed the "iron man" of the PSF.
  
At University of Karachi, Najeeb Ahmed had a few scuffles with policemen posted at the university. He then led PSF into a number of clashes with APMSO the student wing of MQM, before being arrested. Najeeb Ahmed had been leading PSF at the university since 1986, by 1988 he had emerged as the student organisation's top man in Karachi.

In Karachi Najeeb Ahmed was popularly acclaimed as the Quaid-e-Talba (Leader of students) and has become a symbol of bravery for PSF activists all over Pakistan.

Assassination 

On April 6, 1990, Najeeb Ahmed was gunned down by Terrorist of PPP in North Nazimabad area. He died a few days later at the hospital.
  
Due to the violence no student union elections were held in 1990 in Karachi and the rest of Sindh.

See also
Benazir Bhutto
Pakistan Peoples Party
Peoples Students Federation

References 

1990 deaths
University of Karachi alumni
Muhajir people
Pakistan People's Party politicians
Peoples Students Federation
Al-Zulfiqar
Assassinated Pakistani politicians
Politicians from Karachi
People murdered in Karachi
1963 births
Deaths by firearm in Sindh